Snap Judgment is a weekly storytelling radio program and podcast, produced in Oakland, California and distributed by Public Radio Exchange, and hosted by Glynn Washington.

Guests have included comedian Dhaya Lakshminarayanan, Antwan Williams, Alison Becker, Ise Lyfe and Earlonne Woods. Each episode is made up of narrative pieces on a common theme. The program first aired in July 2010. As of November 2017, the podcast was downloaded approximately 2 million times per month, and the program is broadcast across more than 400 radio stations nationwide.

History
In 2008, Glynn Washington won the Public Radio Talent Quest, a talent contest staged by Public Radio Exchange and Corporation for Public Broadcasting. This provided the funding necessary to start the show.

From 2015 through 2020 Snap Judgment was distributed by WNYC  from 2020 to 2021, the program was broadcast in Canada on CBC Radio One.

References

External links
 

WNYC Studios programs
2010 radio programme debuts
2010s American radio programs
Audio podcasts
American documentary radio programs
English-language radio programs
Public Radio International programs
Storytelling